Krishna Viswambhar Salkar is an Indian politician from Goa and a member of the Goa Legislative Assembly. Salkar won the Vasco Da Gama Assembly constituency on the Bharatiya Janata Party ticket in the 2022 Goa Legislative Assembly election. Salkar defeated Carlos Almeida of the Indian National Congress by 3,657 votes.

References

1970 births
Living people
Goa MLAs 2022–2027
Bharatiya Janata Party politicians from Goa
People from North Goa district